Lettomanoppello is a town and comune in province of Pescara,  Abruzzo, central Italy. In Roman times the area was known for its asphalt mines and later for a white stone that could be carved.

Geography
The town is situated near the Majella National Park, about 30 minutes away from the city of Pescara. The mountainous region offers sightseeing in the wilderness or on its highest peaks. During winter it becomes a spot for skiing and winter sports in the mountains.

The town is commonly called "Lu Lette" and the mountain passages are commonly called "Passe Lanciano" by locals.

History
The history of the current town dates back to the 11th century but was certainly occupied earlier by Romans, who excavated asphalt in the area. It is also quarried for its white stone and marble.

Notable people 
 Donald Valle (1908-1977) American businessman and owner of the eponymously named Valle's Steak House.

See also
Hermitage of Sant'Angelo

References